Marhi Da Deeva (Originally in , Literally meaning: The Lamp of the Tomb), sometimes spelled as Marhi Da Diva, is a 1964 Punjabi novel by Gurdial Singh. This first novel established Gurdial Singh as a novelist. 
The author himself described it as the first Punjabi novel in "critical realism". It came in for high praise, with some critics calling it a landmark equivalent to Premchand's Godan. It was translated as The Last Flicker by the Sahitya Akademi.

Adaptation 

The novel was adapted into a 1989 Punjabi film of the same name. Surinder Singh directed the film, which starred Raj Babbar, Deepti Naval and Parikshit Sahni in lead roles. The film received a National Film Award and was critically acclaimed.

References 

Punjabi-language novels
1964 novels
Indian novels adapted into films
1964 Indian novels
National Film Development Corporation of India films